Darrel J. Aubertine (born June 3, 1953) is an American politician and farmer from the State of New York. A Democrat, Aubertine served as Commissioner of the New York State Department of Agriculture and Markets from April 2011 to October 2013. He previously represented New York's 48th State Senate district from February 2008 to December 2010 and represented New York's 118th Assembly District from 2003 to 2008. Aubertine has also held public office at the local level.

Early life
Aubertine was born in Cape Vincent, New York on June 3, 1953. He and his wife Margaret were married in 1977. They have three children: Erin, Paul, and Timothy. He is a farmer.

Political career
Aubertine served on the Cape Vincent town council from 1994 to 1996. In 1996, he was elected to the Jefferson County legislature, where he served until 2002. In 2002, he was elected to the New York State Assembly representing the 118th district. He served in the Assembly from 2003 to 2008. The owner and operator of his farm in Cape Vincent, Aubertine gave up milking cows when he joined the Assembly, but remained an active crop and livestock farmer.

On February 26, 2008, Aubertine won an upset victory over William Barclay in a special election in the 48th district of the New York State Senate. Aubertine succeeded Republican James W. Wright, who retired from the Senate. Barclay's family's ownership of a stretch of the Salmon River became a campaign issue, as the family had charged local fishermen and anglers $30 for access that had previously been free. Aubertine carried significant crossover appeal among Republicans and independents, enabling him to win election in the most Republican district in the State Senate. Aubertine's victory brought the New York State Democrats within one vote of controlling the New York State Senate—and, thus, to controlling all three levels of state power (Democratic Gov. Eliot Spitzer was in office, and Democrats already controlled the State Assembly)---for the first time since 1935.

Soon after being elected in February 2008, Aubertine was successful in securing $250 million for improvements at State University of New York campuses in Oswego and Canton.

On June 22, 2008, the Watertown Daily Times cited unnamed sources in reporting that Gov. David Paterson's office had offered Aubertine a job heading the New York Power Authority. Later that day, the Senator confirmed that he had declined the offer. Two days later, the governor said that there had been a misunderstanding, though sources told the Times Union in Albany that the senator's version of the situation was accurate.

During his November 2008 Senate campaign, Aubertine was criticized for hiring his sister to his staff in violation of State ethics law, though he corrected the problem when notified of the conflict after just a few weeks on the job and later paid back the money she received.

On November 4, 2008, Aubertine defeated Watertown attorney David Renzi with 53% of the vote (52,908 to 46,941) to win re-election to a full term. In November, Aubertine's re-election along with the addition of two new Democratic Senators cleared the way for Sen. Malcolm Smith to be named Majority Leader on January 8, 2009.

Aubertine was named chairman of the Senate's Agriculture Committee on January 7, 2009, replacing Republican Catharine Young. He was an anomaly in that he was a man chairing a committee traditionally led by women (Young, Patricia McGee, and Nancy Larraine Hoffmann before and Patty Ritchie after).

Aubertine was mentioned as a leading candidate to run for the House seat representing New York's 23rd congressional district, formerly held by Republican John McHugh, in 2009. He declined to run for Congress.

On December 2, 2009, Aubertine was one of eight Democratic state senators to vote against same-sex marriage legislation, which failed to pass the Senate.

Aubertine was defeated for re-election by Republican St. Lawrence County Clerk Patricia A. "Patty" Ritchie in November 2010.

Commissioner of the Department of Agriculture and Markets

Governor Andrew Cuomo nominated Aubertine as Commissioner of the New York State Department of Agriculture and Markets on January 6, 2011. Aubertine was unanimously confirmed by the State Senate on April 5, 2011. Aubertine resigned the position in October 2013.

Election results
 February 2008 special election, NYS Senate, 48th SD
{| class="Wikitable"
| Darrel J. Aubertine (DEM – WOR) || ... || 29,504
|-
| Will Barclay (REP – IND – CON) || ... || 26,662
|}

 November 2008 general election, NYS Senate, 48th SD
{| class="Wikitable"
| Darrel J. Aubertine (DEM – WOR) || ... || 52,908
|-
|  David A. Renzi (REP – IND – CON) || ... || 46,942
|}

 November 2010 general election, NYS Senate, 48th SD
{| class="Wikitable"
| Patricia A. Ritchie (REP – CON – TXP) || ... || 38,508
|-
| Darrel J. Aubertine (DEM – IND) || ... || 34,712
|}

See also
 2009 New York State Senate leadership crisis

References

External links
Former New York State Senate website
Official campaign website

1953 births
Living people
Democratic Party members of the New York State Assembly
Democratic Party New York (state) state senators
People from Cape Vincent, New York
21st-century American politicians